The Port of Jinzhou is a seaport on the Bohai Sea in the vicinity of Jinzhou, Liaoning, People's Republic of China.

References

External links
Port of Jinzhou website

Ports and harbours of China